American singer Jenni Rivera has released eleven studio albums, thirteen live albums, three compilation albums, 33 singles. Rivera has been said to be the top-selling Regional Mexican female star of her generation by Billboard with more than 20 million albums sold.

Studio albums

Re-releases

Compilations albums

Live albums

Singles

Featured singles

Guest appearances

References

Discographies of American artists
Regional Mexican music discographies
Discography